The 2011–12 Slovak 1.Liga season was the 19th season of the Slovak 1. Liga, the second level of ice hockey in Slovakia. 13 teams participated in the league, and HC 46 Bardejov won the championship. With HC Slovan Bratislava joining the Kontinental Hockey League for the following season, HK Spišská Nová Ves, MHk 32 Liptovský Mikuláš, HC 07 Prešov, HC Dukla Senica and ŠHK 37 Piešťany applied to be promoted to the Slovak Extraliga. The Slovak Ice Hockey Federation elected to promote ŠHK 37 Piešťany to the Extraliga. HC 46 Bardejov did not apply for promotion as it is HC Kosice's farm team. HK Púchov was relegated to the Slovak 2.Liga.

Regular season

Qualification round

Playoffs

Playouts

Relegation 
HK Trebišov - Iskra Partizánske 4:0 (4:0; 8:2; 4:0; 10:2)

References

External links
 Slovak Ice Hockey Federation

Slovak 1. Liga
Slovak 1. Liga seasons
4